The 2018 NCAA Men's Water Polo Championship occurred from November 24th, 2018 to December 2nd, 2018 in Stanford, California at the Avery Aquatic Center. This was the 50th NCAA Men's Water Polo Championship. Eight teams across from all divisions participated in this championship.

Schedule

Qualification

The six-member selection committee selected eight institutions based on a wide number of factors, primarily number of wins, rigor of schedule, level of availability, an indication of an upward trend or winning consistently, and RPI.

Seeding

Likewise with the criteria mentioned above, seeding was based on level of ranking, geographic proximity to the finals site, and a projected low level of academic commitments missed. The pots outlined feature what level in the championship institutions competed in, ranging from competing away in the first round for Pot 4 to skipping to the semifinals in Pot 1.

Bracket

The championship featured a knockout format where schools that lost were eliminated from the tournament.

Honors

The following distinctions were distributed concluding the championship to athletes that had superior performance of some kind in the championship.

Team rankings

References

2018 in American sports
2018 in water polo
2018 in sports in California
NCAA Men's Water Polo Championship